Ward Chipman Pitfield Jr. (September 6, 1925 – May 14, 2021) was a Canadian financier and Thoroughbred racehorse owner. He was the son of Canadian financier Ward C. Pitfield, a co-founder of the stock brokerage firm, Pitfield, MacKay, Ross.

Ward C. Pitfield served as Chairman of the family brokerage firm. Following the 1984 merger of his Pitfield, MacKay, Ross with Dominion Securities, Ward Pitfield served as the new firm's Chairman until his retirement.

Latterly a resident of Toronto, Ontario, Pitfield served on the board of trustees of the University of Guelph Heritage Fund and was a trustee of the Ontario Jockey Club.

Pitfield died in Toronto in May 2021 at the age of 95.

References

External links
 Ward C. Pitfield at the NTRA

1925 births
2021 deaths
Anglophone Quebec people
Canadian racehorse owners and breeders
People from Montreal
People from Toronto
Stock and commodity market managers